The 2014–15 Slovenian Football Cup was the 24th season of the Slovenian Football Cup, Slovenia's football knockout competition. Gorica were the defending champions, having won their third cup title in the 2013–14 edition.

Qualified clubs

2013–14 Slovenian PrvaLiga members
Celje
Domžale
Gorica
Koper
Krka
Maribor
Olimpija
Rudar Velenje
Triglav Kranj
Zavrč

Qualified through MNZ Regional Cups
MNZ Celje: Šmarje pri Jelšah, Šmartno 1928
MNZ Koper: Jadran Dekani, Tabor Sežana
MNZG-Kranj: Kranj, Šenčur
MNZ Lendava: Odranci, Nafta 1903
MNZ Ljubljana:  Dob, Radomlje
MNZ Maribor: Korotan Prevalje, Lenart
MNZ Murska Sobota: Tromejnik, Veržej
MNZ Nova Gorica: Adria, Brda
MNZ Ptuj: Drava Ptuj, Aluminij

First round
Slovenian PrvaLiga clubs Gorica, Koper, Maribor and Rudar Velenje joined the competition in the second round (round of 16).

Round of 16

Notes

Quarter-finals

First leg

Second leg

Notes

Semi-finals

First leg

Second leg

Final

References
General

Specific

External links
 

Slovenian Football Cup seasons
Cup
Slovenia